HD 11506 b is an extrasolar planet that orbits the star HD 11506 167 light years away in the constellation of Cetus. This planet was discovered in 2007 by the N2K Consortium using the Keck telescope to detect the radial velocity variation of the star caused by the planet. A second planet, HD 11506 c, was discovered in 2015.

In 2022, the true mass and inclination of HD 11506 b were measured via astrometry, along with the discovery of a third planet in the system.

See also
 HD 11506 c

References

Exoplanets discovered in 2007
Giant planets
Cetus (constellation)
Exoplanets detected by radial velocity
Exoplanets detected by astrometry